Blue Dawn-Blue Nights is the final studio album by trumpeter/composer Wallace Roney which was released on the HighNote label in 2019.

Reception

Allmusic's Matt Collar said "Blue Dawn-Blue Nights, finds the trumpeter collaborating with a cadre of young lions and balancing dusky after-hours warmth and propulsive post-bop modalism. ... Somewhat of a departure from Roney's past work, Blue Dawn-Blue Nights features songs written by his bandmates, along with a handful of deftly curated covers. The result is a surprisingly cohesive album that benefits from each player's unique yet clearly like-minded point-of-view". JazzTimes reviewer, Mike Joyce, stated "Given what we’ve long known about his remarkable artistry and output, is it any wonder that Wallace Roney’s latest CD is worth acquiring for its deep soulfulness alone? On this outing the trumpeter delivers the goods upfront, ... Even so, you won’t find Roney lingering in the spotlight for long here. He and drummer Lenny White, who appears on four tracks, seem more interested in guiding the ensemble than leading it, allowing plenty of space for a rotating lineup".

Track listing 
 "Bookendz" (Wallace Roney) – 6:13
 "Why Should There Be Stars" (Bryce Rohde, Kaye Dunham) – 5:28
 "Wolfbane" – 7:54
 "New Breed" (Dave Liebman) – 8:13
 "Don't Stop Me Now" (Steve Lukather, David Paich) – 7:05
 "A Dark Room" (Oscar Williams II) – 9:00
 "Venus Rising" (Emilio Modeste) – 5:15
 "Elliptical" (Modeste) – 4:15

Personnel 
Wallace Roney – trumpet
Emilio Modeste – tenor saxophone, soprano saxophone 
Oscar Williams II – piano
Paul Cuffari – bass
Kojo Odu Roney (tracks 4 & 6-8), Lenny White (tracks 1-3 & 5) – drums
 Quintin Zoto – guitar (tracks 1, 3 & 5)

References 

Wallace Roney albums
2019 albums
HighNote Records albums
Albums recorded at Van Gelder Studio